Jeff Ayars is an American filmmaker and actor known for writing, directing, and performing in the comedy duo Cannibal Milkshake alongside Dan Rosen. He is also known for the film Philadelphia, Ti Amo (2011) starring Rebecca Rittenhouse, his Tribeca Film Festival selection The Snapstory, his acting in FBI: International and his horror feature This Is Our Home.

Education
Ayars grew up in Media, Pennsylvania, where he attended Penncrest High School and was one of 595 students in the country to receive a national writing award from the NCTE during his senior year. Ayars went on to attend Cornell University from 2008 to 2013, graduating with a Bachelor of Fine Arts. During his time at Cornell, Ayars produced videos for the The Cornell Daily Sun and other companies and campus organizations. While on a brief hiatus from Cornell, Ayars studied creative writing at The University of Pennsylvania, where he published a satire of Franz Kafka. Ayars' film and pop-culture thesis was an exploration of personas in film using Ryan Gosling quotations.

Career
As a child, Ayars was in two television commercials for the Philadelphia Phillies in 1993 and 1994. His father, NBC Sports executive and Emmy Award winner Robert Ayars, who at the time worked for the PRISM television network, shot and directed the commercials.

Ayars has gone on to act, produce, direct, edit, and write for various forms of media such as online content, film, television, documentary, short film, and commercial.

Cannibal Milkshake
Cannibal Milkshake is a comedy partnership between Jeff Ayars and his Cornell University classmate Dan Rosen. The duo produces, writes, directs, edits, and acts in their videos, and are frequent contributors to The New Yorker. Ayars and Rosen's sketches have also been featured by CollegeHumor, Funny or Die, Comedy Central, Fortune Magazine, and Elizabeth Banks' WhoHaHa network. Their work is largely tech-world satire and movie parodies, notably featuring Ayars performing as a crazed Bradley Cooper, Oscar Awards-hungry Leonardo DiCaprio, finance-bro Ryan Gosling, and James Bond as a stressed-out dad. Ayars and Rosen have also performed live at New York City venues like the Upright Citizens Brigade Theatre and The People’s Improv Theater, where Ayars performed live with actor Richard Kind and comedian Judy Gold in 2021.

Film
Ayars' first short film during college starred Rebecca Rittenhouse and went on to screen at the Philadelphia Film Festival. His work has subsequently been featured at the NYC Web Fest, New York City Independent Film Festival, Manhattan Film Festival, New Filmmakers Los Angeles, Cinequest Film Festival, The Lower East Side Film Festival, and the Tribeca Film Festival.

Ayars produced and starred in the 2019 psychological thriller feature, This Is Our Home. Written by Rob Harmon and directed by long-time friend and collaborator Omri Dorani, the film co-stars Simone Policano and tells the story of a struggling couple on a weekend away that takes a turn with the arrival of a mysterious child. The film was executive produced by former Paramount Pictures executive Inga Vainshtein Smith, known for Hardcore Henry.

The subject of mental health is an important theme in Ayars' work. He was one of 75 creators selected to attend the Kindred Mind Matters mental health summit sponsored by HBO.

Ayars is developing a romantic comedy feature film GOLD BOY that deals with the subject of mental health and is inspired by his own struggles at Cornell University. The film pitch was a finalist in the Yes, And Laughter Lab initiative to combine comedy and social justice sponsored by Comedy Central.

Television
Since 2013, Ayars has worked at Comcast NBCUniversal, and is currently working as a writer and producer for Morning Joe on MSNBC. He previously worked producing EPKs and promos for NBCUniversal.

In 2022, Ayars made his network television debut as a guest star on Dick Wolf’s CBS procedural FBI: International.  

Ayars has also starred in national television commercials, including a campaign for the Ad Council. He starred as Thomas Jefferson in the 2022 Super Bowl ad for Clickup project management software.

Filmography

References

External links

Living people
American filmmakers
Filmmakers from Pennsylvania
Actors from Pennsylvania
Cornell University alumni
University of Pennsylvania alumni
The New Yorker people
Year of birth missing (living people)